Tom Høyem (born 10 October 1941) is a Danish and German politician, and former headmaster in the European Schools.

Political career in Denmark
Between September 1982 and September 1987, Høyem served as Minister for Greenland within the Danish government under the premiership of Poul Schlüter. He was succeeded by Mimi Jakobsen.

On 14 September 1984, Høyem was awarded the honour of kommandør af Dannebrogordenen.

Høyem has served as independent election observer for Organization for Security and Co-operation in Europe on behalf of the Danish government in Albania, Bosnia and Herzegovina, Montenegro, Ukraine, the State of Palestine and the Democratic Republic of the Congo.

Headmaster in the European Schools 

Between 1987 and 2015, Høyem served successively as the Director (headmaster) of the European School, Culham (1987–1994), the European School, Munich (1994–2000), and the European School, Karlsruhe (2000–2015).

Political career in Germany

In 1994, Høyem joined the Freie Demokratische Partei, the German liberal party, and in 2004 he was elected to serve on the Gemeinderat (council) of the city of Karlsruhe.

References

External links
Official website
Party profile
Facebook

1941 births
Living people
Government ministers of Denmark